200s may refer to:

 The period from 200 to 299, almost synonymous with the 3rd century (201–300)
 The period from 200 to 209, known as the 200s (decade) almost synonymous with the 21st decade (201-210)
 Chrysler 200S, a trim of the Chrysler 200 car